The year 1717 in science and technology involved few significant events.

Biology
 Thomas Fairchild, a nurseryman at Hoxton in the East End of London, becomes the first person to produce a successful scientific plant hybrid, Dianthus Caryophyllus barbatus, known as "Fairchild's Mule".
 James Petiver publishes Papilionum Brittaniae Icones, the first book devoted exclusively to British butterflies, giving English names to a number of species.

Births
 June 5 – Emanuel Mendes da Costa, English botanist (died 1791)
 June 28 – Matthew Stewart, Scottish mathematician (died 1785)
 September 11 – Pehr Wilhelm Wargentin, Swedish astronomer (died 1783)
 November 16 – Jean le Rond d'Alembert, French mathematician (died 1783)
 Pierre Le Roy, French clockmaker (died 1785)
 Wilhelm Friedrich von Gleichen, German microscopist (died 1783)

Deaths
 January 13 – Maria Sibylla Merian, German-born naturalist (born 1647)
 March 8 – Abraham Darby I, English ironmaster (born 1678)

References

 
18th century in science
1710s in science